Heartaches is a 1947 American crime film directed by Basil Wrangell and written by George Bricker. The film stars Sheila Ryan, Edward Norris, Chill Wills, Kenneth Farrell, James Seay, Frank Orth, Chili Williams and Lash LaRue. The film was released on June 28, 1947, by Producers Releasing Corporation.

Plot

Cast       
Sheila Ryan as Toni Wentworth
Edward Norris as Jimmy McDonald
Chill Wills as Boagey Mann
Kenneth Farrell as Vic Morton 
James Seay as Lt. Dan Armstrong
Frank Orth as Mike Connelly
Chili Williams as Sally
Lash LaRue as DeLong 
Charles Mitchell as Pete Schilling
Phyllis Planchard as Lila Fairchild
Ann Staunton as Anne Connelly
Arthur Space as Dan Savronic

References

External links
 

1947 films
American crime films
1947 crime films
Producers Releasing Corporation films
American black-and-white films
1940s English-language films
1940s American films